Raw sienna may refer to:

Raw sienna (color), a natural yellow-brown pigment
Raw Sienna (album), a 1970 album by Savoy Brown